Calliostoma tigris, common name the tiger maurea, is a large species of sea snail, a marine gastropod mollusc in the family Calliostomatidae, the Calliostoma top snails.

Some authors place this taxon in the subgenus Calliostoma (Maurea).

Description
The height of the shell varies between 50 mm and 96 mm. This makes it one of the largest Calliostoma species. The large, imperforate, solid but rather thin shell has a conical shape. It is light yellowish, longitudinally painted with numerous rather narrow irregular chestnut-reddish stripes. The surface of the embryonic whorls is smooth, the others encircled by numerous delicate, finely beaded lirulae, which on the penultimate whorl number about 16-20. On the upper surface of the body whorl there are 18-25 lirulae. The spire is elevated, its lateral outlines concave above. The sutures are a little impressed. The shell contains 10 - 12 whorls, those of the spire flattened, the last convex, rounded at the periphery. The granulation is fine and even, not obsolete on the outer part of the base. The aperture is rhomboidal, iridescent within. The arcuate columella is pearly, bluntly tuberculate at base. This animal is usually found clinging to rock walls and underneath overhangs in caves, from 10m - 200m deep on semi exposed to very exposed open coastline. Feeds on hydroids and other encrusting fauna.

Distribution
This marine species is endemic to New Zealand, where it is also known as rehoreho or matangongore, a Māori name also used for the topshell Cantharidus opalus.

References

External links

Further reading 
 Powell A. W. B., New Zealand Mollusca, William Collins Publishers Ltd, Auckland, New Zealand 1979 

tigris
Gastropods of New Zealand
Gastropods described in 1791
Taxa named by Johann Friedrich Gmelin